The Federation of Reformed Churches (FORC) is a Reformed denomination, founded in 1990, in United States.

The denomination differs from other Reformed denominations in the United States by adopting an optimistic eschatology and paedocommunion.

History 

Formed in 1990, the Federation of Reformed Churches has welcomed formerly Anabaptist, Baptist and Charismatic churches and members. In 2014, the denomination had 9 churches and planted a new church in Brazil in 2015. However, in 2016 the church left the denomination and joined Reformed Presbyterian Church - Hanover Presbytery. As of 2022, 5 churches remain in the denomination.

Two of the denomination's 5 churches joined the Communion of Reformed Evangelical Churches in 2019. They are: Christ Church, in Ithaca, New York and Sovereign Christ Church, in Mount Gilead, Ohio. Both denominations share the same core doctrines, allowing for great diversity among local churches and therefore allowing dual affiliation.  In addition, St. Stephen's Anglican Church, in Williamsville, New York, is an associate member of the Federation of Reformed Churches but is primarily affiliated with the Anglican Communion.

Doctrine 

It adopts the Apostles' Creed, Nicene-Constantinopolitan Creed and Declaration of Chalcedon as official doctrines. Unlike most Presbyterian and Continental Reformed denominations, it adopts an optimistic eschatology and paedocommunion.

Each local church in the denomination must adopt a Reformed confession of faith. In other matters, the denomination allows its churches to adopt different doctrines. Among the affiliated churches are Presbyterian, Continental Reformed and Anglican Reformed.

References 

Reformed denominations in the United States
Christian organizations established in 1990
Calvinist denominations established in the 20th century